"Está Rico" is a song by American singer Marc Anthony, American actor and rapper Will Smith, and Puerto Rican rapper Bad Bunny. The single was released by Sony Music Latin on September 28, 2018.

Background
Speaking about the single, in an interview, Marc Anthony said: "[Will] and I have always wanted to work on a musical collaboration, this song seems perfect for this moment we're both experiencing creatively". About working with Bad Bunny, Anthony also said: "Working with Bad Bunny for the first time has been a great surprise. We all had a magnificent chemistry, and that energy is palpable in both the music and the video".

Music video
The music video for the song features the aforementioned performers, as well as Puerto Rican model Joan Smalls and actor Luis Guzmán. It was directed by Carlos Pérez.

Charts

Weekly charts

Year-end charts

Certifications

References

2018 singles
Will Smith songs
Marc Anthony songs
Bad Bunny songs
2018 songs
Sony Music Latin singles
Spanish-language songs
Songs written by Marc Anthony
Songs written by Will Smith
Songs written by Bad Bunny
Songs written by Edgar Semper
Songs written by Xavier Semper
Songs written by Maejor